Addinston is a farming village, off the A697, close to the Carfraemill roundabout,  with two hill forts and settlements, in Lauderdale in the Scottish Borders area of Scotland, in the former Berwickshire.

The Cleekhimin Burn joins the Leader Water, or River Leader, at Wiselawmill.

Places nearby include Allanshaws, Borthwick Hall, Fountainhall, the Heriot Water, Killochyett, Lauder, Oxton and Stow

See also
List of places in the Scottish Borders
List of places in Scotland

References
 Thomson, A (1902), 'Lauder and Lauderdale', Galashiels.
 Gunn, G (1897), 'Report of the meetings of the Berwickshire Naturalists Club for 1894, Addinstone and Longcroft'.

External links

 RCAHMS/CANMORE entry on Addinston
RCAHMS record of West Addinston Hill
The Megalithic Portal
Geograph image of Addinston hillfort

Villages in the Scottish Borders